František Peyr (5 August 1896 – 26 November 1955) was a Czech footballer. He played in two matches for the Czechoslovakia national football team in 1923.

References

External links
 

1896 births
1955 deaths
Czech footballers
Czechoslovakia international footballers
Footballers from Prague
Association football goalkeepers
AC Sparta Prague players
Footballers at the 1924 Summer Olympics
Olympic footballers of Czechoslovakia